Ryuusei / Sharirara is FLOW's third single. It is a double A-side single. It reached #12 on the Oricon charts in its first week and charted for 10 weeks. *

Track listing

Cover version
4 of Argonavis project casts, Masahiro Itō, Jin Ogasawara, Daisuke Hyūga, and Kōsuke Miyauchi were covered "Ryūsei" on 5th leg of Argonavis Acoustic Tour 2021 -Autumn Session- held in Sendai Rensa on October 23, 2021.

References

2004 singles
Flow (band) songs
Ki/oon Music singles